Drillia dovyalis is a species of sea snail, a marine gastropod mollusc in the family Drilliidae.

Description

Distribution
This species occurs in the demersal zone of the Southeast Atlantic Ocean off South Africa.

References

 Barnard, Keppel Harcourt. Contributions to the knowledge of South African marine Mollusca. Trustees of the South African Museum, 1969.
  Tucker, J.K. 2004 Catalog of recent and fossil turrids (Mollusca: Gastropoda). Zootaxa 682:1–1295

Endemic fauna of South Africa
dovyalis
Gastropods described in 1969